Ustou is a commune in the Ariège department in southwestern France.

The commune of Ustou comprises several villages: Saint-Lizier, Le Trein, Sérac; and numerous hamlets, including: Escots, Bieille, Rouze.

Population
Inhabitants of Ustou are called Ustouens.

Sights
 The Château de Mirabat, a Middle Ages castle, known to be in ruins in the 14th century, is in the communes of Seix, Oust and Ustou.

See also
Communes of the Ariège department

References

Communes of Ariège (department)
Ariège communes articles needing translation from French Wikipedia